The La Salle Higher Secondary School, Multan is a private, Catholic higher secondary school run by the Institute of the Brothers of the Christian Schools in Multan, Punjab, Pakistan. It was founded by Bishop F.B Cialeo, OP in 1960.

History
In the 1940s Bishop F.B Cialeo, OP, first Bishop of Multan requested the La Salle Brothers to run this school in Multan.

The La Salle High School Multan is one of the missionary institutions that were initiated by St. John Baptist De La Salle (the founder of the La Sallian community).

Rev. Bro. Lawrence Manuel, FSC was the longest serving principal of La Salle Higher Secondary School, Multan, i.e. from 1986 to 2007. The current principal is Bro. Shahzad George Gill, FSC.

The principal of the school said that Christian educational institutions have contributed a lot in nurturing the country's leadership. He was responding to Punjab Chief Minister Shahbaz Sharif's 9 June 2008 promise to make Punjab a 100 percent literate province by 2010.

The school's most prominent alumnus is Yousaf Raza Gilani, ex-prime minister of Pakistan.
Brother Emmanuel Nicholas who taught Gilani in the 1960s, was reunited with his student during a South Asian Association for Regional Cooperation meeting in Colombo in March 2008. In 2011, he recommended to the President of Pakistan that Bro. Emmanuel be given the Tamgha-i-Pakistan (Medal of Pakistan) for services he had rendered towards the uplift of the poor in Pakistan. The medal was awarded to him on 23 March 2012, at the Pakistan High Commission in Colombo.

Branches

The other branches of the school in Pakistan are as follows:

Multan

 La Salle Higher Secondary School, Chungi No. 9, Bosan Road, Multan
 Hostel (Oliver Hall)
 Alban  Girls High School Multan
 Youth Centre
 La Salle colony, Behind Rasheedbad Multan

Faisalabad
 La Salle High School, People's Colony 1, Faisalabad
 La Salle Urdu School
 Benildus Boys Hostel
 La Salle Middle School Sant Singh Wala
 La Salle School Gokhowal
 St Catherine's Primary
 La Salle Railway Colony

Karachi
 Don Bosco Home for Boys, c/o St. Patrick's Cathedral, Shahrah-e-Iraq, Karachi - 74400

Khushpur
 La Salle House, Chak 51 G.B., Khushpur, District Faisalabad
 Catechist Training Centre
 Catholic Hostel for Boys
 La Salle High School
 Benildus Literacy Centre

Sindh
 Marie Adelaide Rehabilitation Centre, Umeed Goth, Sinjhoro 68220, Dist. Sanghar, Sindh

House System

There is a three-house system in the school. All houses participate in the activities and competitions of the school. Students are sorted into the houses by dividing roll/admission numbers with 3. The application of this house system can be seen particularly on the Sports Day.

  Jinnah House (Green)
  Iqbal House (Red)
  Liaquat House (Blue)

Principals

The following individuals have served as principal of La Salle Higher Secondary School, Multan:

Co-curricular
Athletics 
Sports including cricket, BasketBall, Table Tennis, Badminton, Football.
Board Games (includes Chess)
Dance
Handwriting
Movie Club
Music (includes Singing)
Nature Watch
Poetry
Science Club
Art
Bazm-e-Adab
Chess Society
Computer Society
Debating Society (English)
Debating Society (Urdu)
Dramatics Club (English)
Dramatics Club (Urdu)
History
Islamic Society
Literary
Mathematics
Quiz
Science Society

References

Educational institutions established in 1960
Mutan
Catholic secondary schools in Pakistan
Schools in Multan
1960 establishments in Pakistan
Private schools in Pakistan